Mitsinjo is a district in western Madagascar. It is a part of Boeny Region and borders the districts of Marovoay in east, Ambato-Boeni in south and Soalala in west.

Communes
The district is further divided into seven communes:

 Ambarimaninga
 Antongomena Bevary
 Antseza
 Bekipay
 Katsepy
 Matsakabanja
 Mitsinjo

Personalities
 Ali Kamé - African champion in Decathlon 2012 is born in Namakia, Mitsinjo District.

References

Districts of Boeny